James Steven Rausch (September 4, 1928 – May 18, 1981) was an American prelate of the Roman Catholic Church.  He served as the second bishop of the Diocese of Phoenix in Arizona from 1977 until his death in 1981.  He previously served as an auxiliary bishop of the Diocese of St. Cloud in Minnesota from 1973 to 1977.

Biography

Early life 
James Rausch was born in Albany, Minnesota on September 4, 1928.  He attended Catholic schools in both Indiana and Minnesota.  After studying economics at the University of Minnesota, Rausch received a Master of Education degree from St. Thomas College in St. Paul, Minnesota,  He later earned a Doctor of Pastoral Psychology degree from the Pontifical Gregorian University in Rome.

Priesthood 
Rausch was ordained a priest for the Diocese of Saint Cloud on June 2, 1956. In 1970, he became assistant general secretary of the United States Catholic Conference USCC) the service arm of the National Conference of Catholic Bishops (NCCB). He became general secretary of both groups in 1972.

Auxiliary Bishop of St. Cloud 
On March 5, 1973, Pope Paul VI appointed Rausch auxiliary bishop of the Diocese of St. Cloud; he was consecrated by Cardinal John Krol on April 16, 1973.

Bishop of Phoenix 
On June 17, 1977, Rausch was appointed bishop of the Phoenix Diocese serving until his death.    He was known for his advocacy of ecumenicism and for speaking out against abortion rights for women.  On occasion, he would celebrate mass in orange groves to accommodate undocumented migrants who were afraid to go into a city.

James Rausch died in Phoenix of a heart attack on May 18, 1981, at age 52.

References

1928 births
1981 deaths
People from Albany, Minnesota
Roman Catholic bishops of Phoenix
Roman Catholic Diocese of Saint Cloud
20th-century Roman Catholic bishops in the United States
Religious leaders from Minnesota
Catholics from Minnesota